La Noche Más Larga is the fifth studio album by Spanish singer Concha Buika. The record was released on June 4, 2013 via Warner Music Spain label.

Plot
Neil Spenser of The Guardian stated "Now relocated to Miami, she's clearly reaching for a pan-American audience on this sixth album. It's an eclectic affair, taking her acrobatic flamenco vocals into a more jazz flavoured zone and mixing her songs with covers of Jacques Brel and Abbey Lincoln."

Angel Romero of World Music Central said " Vivir sin miedo presents another eclectic mix with a Caribbean flavor and smooth pop flavor, including reggae, dub, ragga, flamenco, R&B, afrobeat, pop and gospel, although the dub feel seems to permeate most of the album. Buika is also trying to appeal to a wider audience so she sings in a mix of Spanish and English."

Track listing 

All music arranged by Iván "Melon" Lewis and Ramón Porrina.

Personnel
Buika - Vocals
Iván "Melon" Lewis – Musical direction, piano, keyboards, percussion
Carlos de Motril – Flamenco guitar 
Juan José "Paquete" Suárez – Flamenco guitar
Alain Pérez – Electric bass
John Benítez – Bass
Dafnis Prieto – Drums
Israel "Piraña" Suarez – Percussion
Ramón Porrina – Percussion, backing vocals
Pedrito Martínez – Percussion, backing vocals
Genara Cortés – Backing vocals
Alicia Morales – Backing vocals
Saray Muñoz – Backing vocals
Carlos Sarduy – Trumpet (tracks 2, 5)
"Dizzy" Daniel Moorehead – Saxophone (2)
Pat Metheny – Guitar (8)

Production
Recording engineer – Ted Tuthill assisted by Owen Mulholland
Additional engineers – Alonso Cano, Santiago Quizhpe
Mix – Carlos Álvarez
Mastering – Mike Fuller
Producer (N.Y. Sessions) – Eli Wolf 
Executive Producers - Concha Buika, Iván "Melon" Lewis, Ramón Porrina

References

External links 
Buika's Official Site

2013 albums
Concha Buika albums
Spanish-language albums